The Swift River (Deg Xinag: Xelinhdi; Dena'ina: Huch'altnu) is a tributary, about  long, of the Kuskokwim River in the U.S. state of Alaska.

The Swift is  upriver from the village of Stony River, not Sleetmute.

References

Rivers of Bethel Census Area, Alaska
Rivers of Alaska
Rivers of Unorganized Borough, Alaska